Fischer's dwarf gecko (Lygodactylus fischeri) is a species of lizard in the family Gekkonidae. The species is native to West Africa and Central Africa.

Etymology
The specific name, fischeri, is in honor of German herpetologist Johann Gustav Fischer.

Geographic range
L. fischeri is found in Gabon, Equatorial Guinea, Cameroon, and southeast Nigeria, with a single, isolated record from Benin. The record from Sierra Leone is questionable.

Ecology
L. fischeri is a rare and highly cryptic species occurring in closed humid forest and gallery forest. It is probably an insectivore feeding on ants.

Description
Dorsally, L. fischeri is light olive green, with several longitudinal series of small black dots. Ventrally, it is uniformly white.

Reproduction
L. fischeri is oviparous.

References

Further reading
Loveridge A (1947). "Revision of the African Lizards of the Family Gekkonidae". Bulletin of the Museum of Comparative Zoölogy at Harvard College 98: 1–469. (Lygodactylus fischeri, pp. 206–207).
Rösler H (2000). "Kommentierte Liste der rezent, subrezent und fossil bekannten Geckotaxa (Reptilia: Gekkonomorpha)". Gekkota 2: 28–153. (Lygodactylus fischeri, p. 93). (in German).
Trape, Jean-François; Trape, Sébastien; Chirio, Laurent (2012). Lézards, Crocodiles et tortues d'Afrique occidentale et du Sahara. Paris: IRD Orstom. 503 pp. . (in French).

Lygodactylus
Geckos of Africa
Fauna of Benin
Reptiles of Cameroon
Reptiles of Equatorial Guinea
Reptiles of Gabon
Reptiles of Nigeria
Reptiles described in 1890
Taxa named by George Albert Boulenger